The Forum for European–Australian Science and Technology Cooperation (FEAST) was a non-government initiative aimed at highlighting and developing collaborative research activities between Europe (European countries and the European Union) and Australia. Its offices were located in Canberra, Australia.

Funding
The major sources of funding for FEAST were the European Commission, through the Seventh Framework Programme, and the Australian Government Department of Industry, Innovation, Science, Research and Tertiary Education. Additional resources were also provided by The Australian National University.

History
A meeting of the joint Management Committee of the European Union and Australia on Science and Technology Cooperation was held in Brussels in March 2000, within the framework of the 1994 Agreement. One of the decisions made was to begin reflecting upon a target-based approach based on a strategy and common priorities.

In this context it was agreed in August 2000 by the diplomatic missions representing members of the European Union in Australia, to embark on an initiative of the French Presidency, to be known as the Forum for European-Australian Science and Technology (FEAST).

This initiative began in early 2002, and the first phase was completed in December 2004. An external review was undertaken , recommending expansion of the FEAST concept to other countries, and a continuation of FEAST in Australia.

After successful completion of its third round of funding in mid-2012, the fourth implementation was renamed Connecting Australian-European Science and Innovation Excellence (CAESIE) and placed a greater emphasis on innovation and business. This project concluded at the end of 2015, and no further implementations of the FEAST bilateral initiative have been implemented since.

External links
 
 CAESIE Official Website

Other BILAT (and related) projects
 list of all current BILAT projects
 ABEST/A-EU: Argentinean Bureau for Enhancing Cooperation with the European Community in the Science, Technology and Innovation Area
 BB.Bice: Brazilian Bureau for Enhancing the International Cooperation with European Union
 ERA-Can: The European Research Area and Canada
 CHIEP: Strengthen Chilean European Science and Technology Partnerships
 BILAT SILK: Bilateral Support for the International Linkage with China
 EUINEC: European Union and India Enhanced Cooperation Framework for Improved Bilateral Dialogue in the Fields of Science and Technology
 J-BILAT: BILAT in Japan
 ERA-Link/Japan: A network for European researchers in Japan
 KESTCAP: Korea-EU Science and Technology Cooperation Advancement Programme
 UEMEXCyT: Bureau for European and Mexican Science and Technology Cooperation
 M2ERA: Morocco To ERA
 FRENZ: Facilitating Research co-operation between Europe and New Zealand
 BILAT-RUS: Enhancing the bilateral S&T Partnership with the Russian Federation
 ESASTAP: Strengthening the European-South African Science and Technology Advancement Programme
 ETC: European Tunisian Cooperatio
 BILAT-USA: Bilateral coordination for the enhancement and development of S&T partnerships between the European Union and the United States of America

Scientific organisations based in Australia
Science and technology in Europe
Science and technology in Australia